Kenneth Norman Fletcher (15 June 1940 – 11 February 2006) was an Australian tennis player who won numerous doubles and mixed doubles Grand Slam titles.

Biography
He was born in Brisbane, Queensland, Australia to parents Norm and Ethel Fletcher. He was educated at St Laurence's College and showed early promise as a championship tennis player there. His greatest success as a tennis player came in 1963, when he became the only man to win a calendar year Grand Slam in mixed doubles, partnering fellow Australian Margaret Court. He reached the final of the Australian Open in 1963, losing to Roy Emerson.

After this achievement, he went on to record mixed doubles championships in the Australian Open in 1964, French Open in 1964 and 1965, and Wimbledon in 1965, 1966, and 1968. All of his mixed doubles Grand Slam titles were in partnership with Smith Court.

He also achieved a Grand Slam title in men's doubles in the 1964 French Open, playing with Emerson. At the Wimbledon men's doubles championship, he was a finalist with Robert Hewitt in 1965, the champion in 1966 partnering John Newcombe, and a finalist again in 1967 with Emerson. In total, Fletcher won 27 international tennis titles. He was ranked World No. 10 in 1966 by Lance Tingay of The Daily Telegraph.

Ken was a larrikin by nature, and many of his exploits feature in Hugh Lunn's books, especially Over the Top with Jim and Head Over Heels. In later years, he was instrumental in gaining significant funding for medical research in Australia, through his association with Chuck Feeney. In 2008, Hugh Lunn published The Great Fletch, a book on Ken's life around the globe.

Fletcher died of cancer at the age of 65 and was buried at the Mount Gravatt Lawn Cemetery, Brisbane.

In January 2012, Ken Fletcher was inducted into the Australian Tennis Hall of Fame. 

In 2013, the Ken Fletcher memorial was erected in the park, outside the Queensland Tennis Centre, named in his honour. He is the only player in the history of tennis, to win a grand slam, in mixed doubles in 1963, that is not enshrined in the International Tennis Hall Of Fame.

Grands Slam finals

Singles: 1 (1 runner-up)

Doubles: 9 (2 titles, 7 runners-up)

Mixed doubles: 11 (10 titles, 1 runner-up)

References

External links
 
 
 Hugh Lunn's Website, Vale by Hugh Lunn
 Australian Open Player Profile

Further reading
Lunn, Hugh (2008). The Great Fletch: The Dazzling Life of Wimbledon Aussie Larrikin Ken Fletcher 

1940 births
2006 deaths
Australian Championships (tennis) champions
Australian male tennis players
Deaths from cancer in Queensland
French Championships (tennis) champions
Tennis players from Brisbane
United States National champions (tennis)
Wimbledon champions (pre-Open Era)
Grand Slam (tennis) champions in mixed doubles
Grand Slam (tennis) champions in men's doubles